Orion Ciftja is a physicist and tenured professor at Prairie View A&M University. Ciftja specializes in theoretical physics with strong emphasis in condensed matter physics. His main areas of interest are quantum hall effect, nanoscale structures, and strongly correlated electronic systems.

Awards 
Orion Ciftja has been awarded several National Science Foundation research grants. He also received the distinguished honor of being the KITP scholar in the years 2007–2009. He also has received the Texas A&M University System Teaching Excellence Award on several occasions.

Selected publications
Ciftja has published over 100 refereed papers, has more than 10,000 reads, and has more than 1000 citations to his work.
Two-dimensional quantum-dot helium in a magnetic field: Variational theory, O Ciftja, MG Faruk, Physical Review B 72 (20), 205334	68	2005
Monte Carlo simulation method for Laughlin-like states in a disk geometry, O Ciftja, C Wexler, Physical Review B 67 (7), 075304	67	2003
Equation of state and spin-correlation functions of ultrasmall classical Heisenberg magnets, O Ciftja, M Luban, M Auslender, JH Luscombe, Physical Review B 60 (14), 10122	63	1999
Ground state of two-dimensional quantum-dot helium in zero magnetic field: Perturbation, diagonalization, and variational theory, O Ciftja, AA Kumar, Physical Review B 70 (20), 205326, 59, 2004
Understanding electronic systems in semiconductor quantum dots, O Ciftja, Physica Scripta 88 (5), 058302	51	2013

References

External links 
 

Living people
Prairie View A&M University faculty
21st-century American physicists
Year of birth missing (living people)